Warning Shots is a compilation album by Swedish metal band The Haunted. It was released in Europe on 9 March 2009 and in the US on 7 April 2009.

Track listing

Disc one

Disc two

Personnel

The Haunted 
Anders Björler – lead guitar
Patrik Jensen – rhythm guitar
Jonas Björler – bass
Peter Dolving – vocals (disc 1: 1, 5, 8, 14, 16 & disc 2: 8-12)
Per Möller Jensen – drums (disc 1: 2-4, 6, 7, 9-11, 15 & disc 2: 1-7)

Additional personnel 
Marco Aro – vocals (disc 1: 2-4, 6, 7, 9-11, 15 & disc 2: 1-7)
Adrian Erlandsson – drums (disc 1: 1, 5, 8, 14, 16 & disc 2: 8-12)

References 

2009 compilation albums
The Haunted (Swedish band) albums
Earache Records compilation albums
Albums produced by Fredrik Nordström